Nitria could refer to:

Nitra, a city in western Slovakia
Nitria (monastic site), abandoned site of early Christian monastic activity
Nitrian Desert, region in northwestern Egypt